Damian Abraham (also known as Father Damian, Pink Eyes and Mr. Damian) is a Canadian musician and presenter who first came to prominence as the vocalist for the band Fucked Up.

Career 
Abraham formed Fucked Up in Toronto in 2001. To date the band has released five studio albums, numerous singles, and were the winners of the 2009 Polaris Music Prize.  On several occasions Abraham has joined Dinosaur Jr. for guest vocals when they have appeared live in Toronto.

In 2009, Abraham was invited to become a regular guest (appearing one to three times a month) on the Fox News show Red Eye w/ Greg Gutfeld, which he had previously appeared on twice. Since 2014 he has hosted his own podcast "Turned Out A Punk." He has also hosted The Wedge on MuchMusic and Vice series The Wrestlers which follows him around USA, Mexico, Japan and other countries in pursuit of the best the world has to offer.

Personal life 
Since September 2006, Abraham has been married to Lauren Moses-Brettler. The couple appeared on a reality television show called Newly Wed, Nearly Dead. They have three children.

References

Living people
Canadian punk rock singers
1979 births
Much (TV channel) personalities